Ameesha Patel is an Indian actress who appears in Hindi films. She has won the Best Female Debut for her performance in the 2000's romantic action film Kaho Naa... Pyaar Hai and Filmfare Special Award for Gadar: Ek Prem Katha. She has received three Star Screen Awards and IIFA Awards nominations respectively.

Filmfare Awards

Star Screen Awards

Zee Cine Awards

Bollywood Movie Awards

IIFA Awards

Stardust Awards

Sansui Awards

Planet-Bollywood People's Choice Awards

Other awards

References

Lists of awards received by Indian actor